Echinoteuthis atlantica is a species of whip-lash squid from the family Mastigoteuthidae. It occurs in the eastern North and South Atlantic Ocean. This squid is red in colour and similar to Echinoteuthis famelica of the Pacific but differs in having a well developed protective membrane on the tentacular club which is absent on E. famelica. The presence on this membrane on  Echinoteuthis glaukopis from the Indian Ocean suggests that this may be a synonym of E. atlantica, in which case glaukopis has priority.

References

Joubin, L. 1933. Notes préliminaires sur les Céphalopodes des croisières du Dana (1921-1922). 4e Partie. Annales de l'Institut Océanographique 13: 1-49.

External links

Tree of Life web project: Mastigoteuthis atlantica

Mastigoteuthis
Molluscs of the Atlantic Ocean
Molluscs described in 1933